Santorini (Thira) International Airport  is an airport in Santorini/Thira, Greece located north of the village of Kamari. The airport serves as both a military and a civil airport. With its redesigned apron, as of 2021 the airport is able to serve up to nine civilian airliners at the same time. Santorini is one of the few Cyclades Islands with a major airport.

The parallel taxiway was built and marked to runway specification but is now marked and lighted as a taxiway. The airfield can accommodate medium-sized jets like the Boeing 757, Boeing 737 and Airbus 320 series as well as smaller aircraft such as the Avro RJ, Fokker 70, and ATR 72. Scheduled airlines include Ryanair, Olympic Air and Aegean Airlines, with seasonal scheduled and charter flights from other airlines during the higher seasons in spring, summer and autumn. Transportation to and from the air terminal is via buses, taxis, hotel car-pickups and hired cars.

History 

The airport first operated in 1972.

In December 2015 the privatisation of Santorini (Thira) International Airport and 13 other regional airports of Greece was finalised with the signing of the agreement between the Fraport AG/Copelouzos Group joint venture and the state privatisation fund. According to the agreement, the joint venture will operate the 14 airports (including Santorini (Thira) International Airport) for 40 years as of 11 April 2017.
In 2016 the airport was voted as one of the worst airports, the commentary mentions the situation in summer where travelers can wait for hours under the hot sun while inside they are crammed into small rooms without air conditioning.

Airlines and destinations
The following airlines operate regular scheduled and charter flights at Santorini (Thira) Airport:

Traffic figures 

The data are from Hellenic Civil Aviation Authority (CAA) until 2016, and from the airport's official website from 2017 thereafter.

Traffic statistics by country (2022)

See also 
Transport in Greece

References

External links 

Official website / Civil Aviation Authority
Santorini airport information
Santorini bus schedules

Airports in Greece
Buildings and structures in Santorini